Balhaf is an industrial port town and an oasis in an area of coastal dunes in the Burum Coastal Area of Yemen. It has palm trees and white sand, which gives way to fields of black lava and to the fishing port of Bir-Ali. Qana, a major point of departure of the Route I'Encens, was the main port of the ancient kingdom of Hadhramaut, and is dominated by a hill, Husn al-Ghurab, or remains of the ancient vestiges. A I'écart is located on an extinct volcano, a crater lake with turquoise waters. The "Corniche" road leads to the coastal port of Burum. Burum, a typical fishing port, is an old village surrounded by a gypsum kilns. Close by, one can see the large bay of Mukalla, whose wetlands are populated by migrant birds from India or Africa.

Location 
Balhaf belongs to Shabwa of Yemen, located about 150 km from Mukalla-the capital of Hadhramaut (48.1802°E 13.9854°N).

History
Balhaf was the capital of the Sultanate of Wahidi Balhaf, one of several Wahini states which in the 1880s became part of the British Aden Protectorate. In 1902 the fort at Balhaf was demolished by troops from the British cruiser HMS Perseus, in response to pirate activities by the locals.

World Heritage status
This site was added to the UNESCO World Heritage Tentative List on 08/07/2002, in the mixed (cultural and natural) category.

Importance
Balhaf is now considered one of the main ports of Yemen, particularly after the success of Yemen LNG project for constructing a liquefied natural gas plant in 2006.

Notes

References 

Geography of Yemen
Oases
Populated places in Shabwah Governorate
Populated coastal places in Yemen
Towns in Yemen